Erik Karlberg (born May 5, 1988, in Tyringe, Sweden) is a Swedish professional ice hockey player. He is currently playing with Skellefteå AIK in the Elitserien.

References

External links

1988 births
Living people
Skellefteå AIK players
Swedish ice hockey forwards